Mocane is an unincorporated community in Beaver County, Oklahoma, United States.  Its elevation is 2,631 feet (802 m).  A post office once operated in Mocane, but it is no longer in existence.  Mocane is the closest community to the Billy Rose Archeological Site, which is listed on the National Register of Historic Places.

References

Unincorporated communities in Beaver County, Oklahoma
Unincorporated communities in Oklahoma
Oklahoma Panhandle